Ferdinando Cavalleri (1794–1867) was an Italian painter, specializing in history subjects and portrait, active in a Neoclassical-style.

Life
He was born at Turin, and studied art at Rome. He was in later life a professor at the Academy of St. Luke in Rome.

Works
His works include:
Beatrice Cenci ascending the Scaffold.
The Burning of Old St Paul's.
The Death of Leonardo da Vinci.
Prince Eugene, after the Battle of Peterwardein.
Self-Portrait (in the Uffizi, Florence).

References
 

1794 births
1867 deaths
Painters from Turin
18th-century Italian painters
Italian male painters
19th-century Italian painters
19th-century Italian male artists
18th-century Italian male artists